Eclipse phase may refer to:
 Part of the viral life cycle
 Eclipse Phase (role-playing game), a science–fiction, role–playing game